The 1977 Ball State Cardinals football team was an American football team that represented Ball State University in the Mid-American Conference (MAC) during the 1977 NCAA Division I football season. In its seventh season under head coach Dave McClain, the team compiled a 9–2 record (5–1 against conference opponents) and finished third in the MAC. The team played its home games at Ball State Stadium in Muncie, Indiana.

The team's statistical leaders included Dave Wilson with 1,589 passing yards, George Jenkins with 1,070 rushing yards, Rick Morrison with 908 receiving yards and 60 points scored.

Schedule

References

Ball State
Ball State Cardinals football seasons
Ball State Cardinals football